Renfrew—Nipissing—Pembroke is a provincial electoral district in Ontario, Canada, that has been represented in the Legislative Assembly of Ontario since 1999.

It is represented by John Yakabuski of the Progressive Conservative Party.

The population of the riding in 2006 was 98,803.

Renfrew—Nipissing—Pembroke includes all of Renfrew County and a small section of Nipissing District around Algonquin Provincial Park.

The largest community in the riding is the city of Pembroke; other communities include Arnprior, Barry's Bay, Chalk River, Cobden, Deep River, Eganville, Killaloe, Petawawa and Renfrew.

Until recently, the riding was a Liberal stronghold both federally and provincially; however, a growing agricultural and religious base has turned this into one of the most conservative areas in Ontario. It was the only riding the Liberals had and lost in the 2003 provincial election.

Geography

The riding consists of
 the County of Renfrew; and
 the part of the Territorial District of Nipissing lying south and east of and including the townships of Deacon, Lister, Anglin, Dickson, Preston and Airy.

History

The provincial electoral district was created in 1999 when provincial ridings were defined to have the same borders as federal ridings.

Members of Provincial Parliament

Election results

2007 Electoral Reform Referendum

Sources

Elections Ontario Past Election Results
Map of riding for 2018 election

Ontario provincial electoral districts
Pembroke, Ontario